State Road 225 (NM 225) is a , paved, two-lane state highway in Doña Ana County in the U.S. state of New Mexico. NM 225's western terminus is north of La Union at the road's junction with NM 28. The road's eastern terminus is near Anthony at the Texas state line where it continues east as Farm to Market Road 1905 (FM 1905) in Texas. NM 225 is also known as Washington Street.

Route description
The highway begins at the junction with NM 28 north of La Union, right across from Gadsden High School. The road heads mainly east through pecan orchards and fields of Mesilla Valley and after approximately  crosses the Rio Grande river over a  bridge, built in 1990. The highway continues travelling east, passing by Gadsden Middle School, before reaching its eastern terminus at the Texas state line at the western outskirts of the community of Anthony.

History
NM 225 was constructed in the early 1940s as one of the spurs connecting NM 28 with agricultural communities lying along U.S. Route 85 (US 85). In late 1950s this stretch was designated as NM 225.

Major intersections

See also

References

External links

225
Transportation in Doña Ana County, New Mexico